The Iraqi census of 1957 was the second census taken in the Kingdom of Iraq. The census took place after more than 25 years of the establishment of the Iraq. The census showed that the country had a total population of 6,339,960. Muslims made 95% of the total population, with Christians coming second at 3.3%, Yezidis with 0.88%, and Jews with 0.08%. The biggest city was the capital Baghdad, with a population of 490,496.

Sources
1957 Iraqi census (archived from the original on February 27, 2012).

Demographics of Iraq